William Sutherland may refer to:

 William Sutherland of Roscommon (died 1715), Member of the Scottish Parliament
 William Sutherland, 17th Earl of Sutherland (1708–1750), Scottish nobleman
 William Sutherland (British Army officer), fought in the American Revolutionary War
 William Sutherland (Northwest Territories politician) (1854–1930), general merchant and political figure in the Northwest Territories, Canada
 William Sutherland (physicist) (1859–1911), Australian physicist
 William Charles Sutherland (1865–1940), Speaker of the Legislative Assembly of Saskatchewan, Canada
 William Garner Sutherland (1873–1954), American osteopath
 William A. Sutherland (California politician) (1874–1935), American lawyer and California State Assemblyman
 William Andrew Sutherland (1849–1908), New York lawyer and politician
 William A. Sutherland (American football) (1876–1969), American football coach and lawyer
 William Henry Sutherland (1876–1945), physician and political figure in British Columbia
 Sir William Sutherland (Liberal politician) (1880–1949), Chancellor of the Duchy of Lancaster
 William Sutherland (Ontario politician) (1926/7–1998), city councillor in North York, Ontario
 Sir William Sutherland (police officer) (1933–2022), British police officer
 Bill Sutherland (1934–2017), Canadian ice hockey player
 William R. Sutherland, better known as Bert Sutherland (born 1936), American technology researcher
 T. Bill Sutherland (born 1942), American theoretical physicist
 William J. Sutherland (born 1956), British conservation biologist